Mile Square Regional Park is a park located in Fountain Valley, California, United States. It includes two lakes, three 18-hole golf courses, archery range, baseball and softball fields, picnic shelters, and a  urban nature area planted with California native plants, a 55-acre (223,000 m2) recreation center with tennis courts, basketball courts, racquetball courts, a gymnasium, the Kingston Boys & Girls Club, and a community center. This regional park was built on a naval landing field soon after the city was incorporated. James Kanno, one of America's first Japanese American mayors, led the effort to create the park.

The park derives its name from the near-perfect square of land that it occupies, bounded by Edinger and Warner Avenues on the north and south sides, and Brookhurst and Euclid Streets on the west and east sides, respectively.

Background
In 1942, the Navy purchased  of agricultural land for Mile Square Naval Outer Landing Field, which used as an auxiliary for Naval Air Station, Los Alamitos. It was used for carrier deck qualification practice by Navy aircraft. In March 1967, Orange County entered into a long-term lease with the Navy Department for the perimeter area of the site which allowed the county to develop this area for regional park purposes. Military operations in the center airfield ceased in 1974. It is now operated by OC Parks. 

The park was built in several phases:
Phase II added the baseball diamond and a children's play area in 1973
Phase III extended the park northward to Edinger Avenue in 1976
Phase IV development commenced in the spring of 1987 and included the construction of an executive golf course.

Del Taco, a fast food chain based in Orange County, filmed a commercial on the south end of the park in early 2007, celebrating its 76th anniversary.

See also
Abandoned & Little-Known Airfields

References

External links
OCParks.com: Mile Square Regional Park
Mile Square Golf Course
Mile Square Park Fountain Valley  of fun

Regional parks in California
Parks in Orange County, California